Philip Hoffman (born 2002) is an Austrian Olympic alpine skier. He participated at the 2020 Winter Youth Olympics in the alpine skiing competition, being awarded the gold medal in the boys' giant slalom event. Hoffman also participated in the parallel mixed team event, being awarded the bronze medal with his teammate, Amanda Salzgeber.

References

External links 

2002 births
Living people
Place of birth missing (living people)
Alpine skiers at the 2020 Winter Youth Olympics
Medalists at the 2020 Winter Youth Olympics
Austrian male alpine skiers
21st-century Austrian people